Parankimala is a 1981 Indian Malayalam-language film based on the 1971 novel of the same name by Kakkanadan. Directed by Bharathan and produced by M. O. Joseph, the film stars Sukumari, Nedumudi Venu, Achankunju and Bahadoor. The film has musical score by G. Devarajan.
The film is considered a classic in Malayalam cinema. It was remade in 2014 under the same name.

Plot
Thangam and Appu are in love. But Appu's family opposes their love.

Cast
Soorya as Thankam (Voice dubbed by KPAC Lalitha)
Benny as Appu
Sukumari as Appu's Mother
Nedumudi Venu as Velu Annan/Kottuvadi
Achankunju as Pillai Chettan, Thankam's Father 
 Kuttiyedathi Vilasini as Thankam's mother 
Bahadoor as Govinda Kaniyan, Naniyamma's husband 
Kundara Johny as Chandran,Appu's brother-in-law 
Ranipadmini as Sreedevi 
T. G. Ravi as Kunjippalu ,Lorry driver 
Lalithasree as Naniyamma
 Master Kishore Kumar as Thankam's brother

Soundtrack
The music was composed by G. Devarajan with lyrics by P. Bhaskaran.

References

External links
 

1981 films
Films scored by G. Devarajan
1980s Malayalam-language films